Spogmai FM (Pashto: سپوږمۍ اېف اېم) is a media organization of Axon Media Group based in Kabul, Afghanistan. Spogmai FM began broadcasting different programs in the cities of Kabul and Kandahar on FM 102.2 in October 2008.

Radio 
Spogmai radio brings a variety of news, political, economic, social, cultural, and entertainment programs to its audiences. Spogmai radio is a partner of China Radio International Pashto (CRI Pashto) and China Radio International (CRI) which is a state-owned international radio broadcaster of the People's Republic of China, in Afghanistan. It airs CRI Pashto's Pashto programs in Afghanistan.

STR News 
STR News (Spogmai Television Radio News) is a news TV channel launched in December 2020.

China Media Group in cooperation with STR News has been working on a documentary about the 20 years of war of U.S. and its allies in Afghanistan and has been released on the 15th of August 2022. The documentary tells stories of people affected by the war and how they were left after the withdrawal of U.S. troops and its allies in August of 2021.

See also 
 List of Radio Stations in Afghanistan 
 List of Pashto Radio Stations
 International Metropolitan Broadcast Media Cooperation Forum in Beijing China
 Spogmai Radio ranked as the third most listened radio in a survey by Pajhwok Afghan News in Kabul
 Spogmai Radio ranked as the fourth most listened radio in a survey by Waamaa Research and Results Organization (WRRO) in Kabul

External links

References 

Radio in Afghanistan
2008 establishments in Afghanistan
Radio stations established in 2008
Mass media in Kabul
Radio stations in Afghanistan
Organisations based in Kabul